Tachynectes is an extinct genus of prehistoric ray-finned fish that lived from the Turonian to the Campanian.

See also

 Prehistoric fish
 List of prehistoric bony fish

References

Late Cretaceous fish
Elopiformes
Prehistoric ray-finned fish genera